Al-Jazeera Club is a Jordanian multisports club based in Amman. Founded in 1947, the team plays at Amman International Stadium. They complete in the Jordanian Pro League, the top flight of Jordanian football.

History
In the early 1940s, the club consisted of boys who shared common traits like age, social status, friendship, neighborhood, education and love for sports, especially football. They began practicing football as a team with intense training, and felt that their talents merged well. The team members enhancing and developing their talents included the late Amer Mufti, Tbelt Fattah and Abdul Raouf Al Attia, Abdul-Raouf Noha and Muhammad Ali Karyoti and Honorary Nanaa and facilitate the drum and facilitating the latest Shorbaji and Taher Al-Halawani Wool and Mohammed Abu Sultan, Mohammed and Omar News vegetative and Mohammed and Ahmed and Awad Hamid. Applied for Foundation to the Ministry of the Interior in 1946, but the request was re-insurance to 10 people, among the founders over the age of
For the 25-year re-entry has been remedied that mentioned their families and acquaintances Fastdrqua what they were asked
A request was made Altosin the following names:

 Hassan Hussein Rouh – An employee. Later became a professor.
 Abdul Majeed Aljzazi – A professor. Later entered the army.
 Fawzi Yousef Dia – A professor. Later entered the army.
 Qasim Karyoti – A member of staff in the workshops of the Army.
 Abdul Karim Bakir – Merchant
 Diab Shorbaji – Merchant
 Ahmed Shorbaji – Merchant
 Mufti Mohammad Sami – A merchant and tailor.
 Abdul Hadi Akash – Restaurant owner of 'Pleasure' in Amman.
 Fred Joseph Fleifel – Was employed.
And approved the establishment of the club by the Interior Ministry in 01/01/1947 as approved on its Procedure and it appears to the existence of a club named (the island) and taking exercise and various sports activities on top Football.

Stadium
Al-Jazeera plays their home games at Amman International Stadium in Amman. The stadium was built on 1964 and opened on 1968, it is owned by The Jordanian government and operated by The higher council of youth. It is also the home stadium of Jordan national football team and Al-Faisaly. It has a current capacity of 17,619 spectators.

Kits
Al-Jazeera's home kit is all red shirts and white shorts, while their away kit is all white shirts and red shorts.

Kit suppliers and shirt sponsors

Honours

Performance in AFC and UAFA competitions

AFC Cup: 4 Appearances
2015: Round of 16
2018: West Asia Zonal final
2019: West Asia Zonal final
2020: Cancelled

IFFHS Rankings

Club world ranking
Footballdatabase club's points August 2020.

AFC club rankings
Footballdatabase club's points August 2020.

National club rankings
Footballdatabase club's points August 2020.

Current squad

Current technical staff

Managerial history

Presidential history

References

External links
Al-Jazeera Amman (19/20)
فريق: الجزيرة
Jordan - Al Jazeera Club Amman - Results, fixtures, squad, statistics, photos, videos and news - Soccerway
الجزيرة الأردني - كرة القدم - Eurosport Arabia

Football clubs in Jordan
Football clubs in Amman
Association football clubs established in 1947
Sport in Amman
1947 establishments in Jordan